Viktor Yuryevich Zemlin (born 24 January 1964 in Trubino) is a former Russian football player.

References

1964 births
People from Shchyolkovsky District
Living people
Soviet footballers
FC Dynamo Moscow reserves players
PFC CSKA Moscow players
FC Lokomotiv Moscow players
Russian footballers
FC Shinnik Yaroslavl players
Russian Premier League players
Association football forwards
Sportspeople from Moscow Oblast